Gordon Sholto McDougall (born 7 February 1916 – 18 May 1991) was a Scottish Australian actor. He trained at the Glasgow Athenaeum (now known as The Royal Conservatoire of Scotland). After immigrating to Australia, he worked in numerous theatre productions as both an actor and director, but became best known in TV soap opera Number 96, firstly as amateur inventor Les Whittaker, who was a comedy character opposite Sheila Kennelly and subsequently albeit less successfully as his aristocratic brother Andrew Whittaker, Lord McCraddenow.

Career

Theatre and radio
McDougall started acting professionally in 1936 working in various facets of the entertainment industry, including radio and stage. He emigrated to Australia and started his career on stage over all-in a long career he appeared in more than 50 theatre productions. 

These theatre roles included Arthur Miller's Death of a Salesman, Cat Among the Pigeons, Habeas Corpus, musicals 1776 and Promises, Promises. He played in Shakespeare's Twelfth Night and Much Ado About Nothing for the Nimrod Theatre.

Television
In  1969 McDougall appeared in the ABC adaptation of Hesba Fay Brinsmead's Pastures of the Blue Crane. 

In the late 1960s early 1970s he had guest roles in Crawford Productions police procedurals Homicide and Division 4 and a regular role in 1972 comedy series A Nice Day at the Office which ran for seven episodes.   
 
McDougall found his widest audience through his role of amateur inventor Les Whittaker, husband to brassy barmaid Norma (Sheila Kennelly), in hit soap opera Number 96. Comedy characters Les and Norma joined the series early in its 1972–1977 run and became very popular. Along with most of the show's regular cast, McDougall reprised his role in the 1974 film version of the series.

After a fall in ratings in 1975 Les was killed off in a dramatic revamp of the series: the famous bomb storyline. It had been decided that Les's constant crazy inventions were becoming too silly, and that his death would open up the character of Norma to new romances and other storylines. The Number 96 producers soon realised that killing Les was a mistake, and McDougall was returned to the series in late 1976 as Les's long-lost brother, the aristocratic Lord Andrew McCraddenow. The new character did not work as well as Les had, and six months later both Andrew and Norma were written out of the series during another cast revamp.
 
He appeared in a small role in the film The Fourth Wish starring John Meillon and thriller The Killing of Angel Street
 
After Number 96 McDougall acted in Australian television films and had guest roles in such drama series as Chopper Squad, Prisoner, A Country Practice, and sitcom Mother and Son.

He retired from acting in 1987.

He was married to Margaret Mackie and died in Sydney, Australia on 18 May 1991, aged 75.

Filmography (selected)

References

External links

Australian male film actors
Australian male stage actors
Australian male television actors
British emigrants to Australia
Male actors from Glasgow
1916 births
1991 deaths